The 2012–14 European Nations Cup Second Division is the third tier rugby union in Europe behind the Six Nations Championship and the 2012-2014 European Nations Cup First Division.

The second division comprises four pools (2A, 2B, 2C, and 2D). Teams within each division play each other in a home and away round robin schedule over a two-year period.

At the end of every season a champion was declared according but for relegation and promotion only the two years ranking are considered.
The first in the 2012–2014 ranking of each pool will be promoted while last place teams will be relegated. Winners of pool 2A, will be promoted to division 1 pool B for the 2014–16 edition while the last place team in pool 2A will be relegated to pool 2B. Likewise, winners of 2B will be promoted to 2A, last place in 2B will be relegated to 2C, winner of 2C will be promoted to 2B, last place of 2C will be relegated to 2D, winner of 2D will be promoted to 2C and last place of 2D will be relegated to 3; The winner of 3 replacing the relegated 2D team. Additionally, there will be playoff matches between second place teams and fourth place teams between pools. Winners of these playoffs will determine if additional promotions/relegation occur. There will no playoff between the fourth of 2D and the second of 3.

In addition to the season competitions, the 2012–2013 seasons in all four pools doubles as a 2015 Rugby World Cup qualifier.  The winning teams in each pool will play off for the chance to challenge the Division 1 teams for the repechage place for Europe.

Division 2A

2012–2013
Table

Pre tournament rankings in parentheses.

Games

2013–14
Table

Games

2012–2014

Pre tournament rankings in parentheses.

Division 2B

2012–2013
Table

Numbers in parentheses are pre-tournament rankings.

Games

2013–14
Table

Games

2012–2014

Numbers in parentheses are pre-tournament rankings.

Division 2C

2012–2013
Table

Pre tournament rankings in parentheses.  NR=no ranking

Games

 This was the 18th consecutive Test match win for Cyprus, a new world record. The previous record of 17 was held jointly by New Zealand, South Africa, and Lithuania. (Although International Rugby Board records credit Lithuania with 18 consecutive wins from 2006 to 2010, ESPN Scrum pointed out that this streak should be reduced by one, as this 18-match sequence in fact included one loss.)

2013–14
Table

Games

2012–2014

Pre tournament rankings in parentheses.  NR=no ranking

Division 2D

2012–2013
Table

Pre-tournament rankings in parentheses.  NR=No ranking

Games

2013–14
Table

Games

2012–2014

Pre-tournament rankings in parentheses.  NR=No ranking

Promotion/relegation playoffs

Division 2A-Division 2B
Division 2B's 2nd placed Latvia hosted Division 2A's 4th placed Croatia.  Croatia won and retained their place in the ENC Division 2A for 2014–2016, while Latvia will play in the ENC Division 2B.

Division 2B-Division 2C
Division 2C's 2nd placed Hungary were due to host Division 2B's 4th placed Denmark.  However, Denmark chose not to play the match, and therefore Hungary were promoted to Division 2B for 2014–16, while Denmark was relegated to Division 2C.

Division 2C-Division 2D
Division 2D's 2nd placed Bosnia and Herzegovina hosted Division 2C's 4th placed Austria.  Austria won and retained their place in the ENC Division 2C for 2014–2016, while Bosnia and Herzegovina will remain in the ENC Division 2D.

Pre-game rankings in parentheses

References

2012-14
2012–13 in European rugby union
2013–14 in European rugby union
European Nations Cup Second Division
European Nations Cup Second Division
European Nations Cup Second Division